Self Titled or Scoop Du Jour is the third full-length album released by the American three piece band Whirlwind Heat.

Track listing 

2008 albums
Whirlwind Heat albums